The 2022 European Women's Handball Championship was held in Slovenia, North Macedonia and Montenegro from 4 to 20 November 2022. It showed an impressive action by the Norwegian right-back Nora Mørk, who was the top scorer of the EHF EURO 2022, and Henny Reistad, the MVP. The tournament has been advanced a month in order not to coincide with the 2022 FIFA World Cup in Qatar.

The top three team qualified for the 2023 World Championship and the winner will also qualify for the 2024 Summer Olympics.

Norway won their ninth title after defeating Denmark in the final. Bronze went to Montenegro, who defeated France at the extra time.

Venues

Qualification

Qualified teams 

1 Bold indicates champion for that year. Italic indicates host for that year.

Draw 
The draw was held on 28 April 2022 in Ljubljana, Slovenia.

Seedings 
The pots were announced on 25 April 2022.

Referees 
Twelve referee pairs were selected on 13 June 2022. Two pairs were replaced in October 2022.

Squads 

Each squad consisted of 20 players, and 16 players were selected on the day of each match. There was a maximum of six players who can be replaced during the tournament. However, in regard to the COVID-19 pandemic and the potential risk of several players from the same team testing positive, there was no limit to the number of replacements for players testing positive.

Preliminary round 
All times are UTC+1.

Group A

Group B

Group C

Group D

Main round

Group I

Group II

Knockout stage

Bracket

Fifth place game

Semifinals

Third place game

Final

Final ranking and awards

Final ranking

All Star Team 
The All Star Team and awards were announced on 20 November 2022.

Statistics

Top goalscorers

Top goalkeepers

Marketing 
The official logo was unveiled on 25 March 2021 the same day as the qualifiers draw in Vienna, Austria, The colours in the tournament logo and branding take inspiration from various elements connected to host cities in nations, Slovenia, North Macedonia and Montenegro.

References

External links 
EHF Euro 2022 at eurohandball.com

 
2022
European Championship, Women
European Championship, Women, 2022
European Championship, Women, 2022
European Championship, Women, 2022
November 2022 sports events in Europe
2022
2022
2022
2022
Hand
Euro